Massa is a town in Chtouka Aït Baha Province, Souss-Massa, Morocco. According to the 2004 census it has a population of 8,999.

References

Populated places in Chtouka Aït Baha Province
Rural communes of Souss-Massa